The tattoo is a recurring symbol in the supernatural TV series Haven.

The tattoo consists of a round maze with a tiny human figure at each compass point. It can be seen during the opening credits sequence. The fleeting glimpse of the symbol on a stone during the sequence suggests that there is some ritual associated with it, for a figure of a man moves a container filled with a strange concoction towards the stone. There is a feather used as part of the ritual, perhaps indicating a Native American involvement. Haven's original name is Tuwiuwok, a Mi'kmaq name we are told meaning "Haven for God's Orphans".("Welcome to Haven") The tattoo is first seen on the forearm of Phil Reiser, a victim of the Troubles.("Ball and Chain")

It is revealed in "Over My Head" that this tattoo is the sign of a group called "The Guard." Every person who gets the tattoo is himself (or herself) Troubled. The purpose of the group is to protect the Troubled.

Duke and the tattoo
When she was young, Vanessa Stanley, a person Troubled with seeing what will kill a person, touched the Colorado Kid and she saw an arm with the maze tattoo coming towards him. She describes the circumstances of Duke Crocker's death in the same manner. This makes Duke very interested in the tattoo. Nathan, who investigated the dead man with the tattoo, draws it for Duke. (The Hand You're Dealt)

When Duke learns that Max Hansen has the tattoo on his forearm, he becomes apprehensive, believing Hansen to be his would-be killer. When Hansen is swallowed by a crack in the road, Duke is very relieved, thinking that the man who was to kill him is now dead. Julia Carr soon robs him of relief when she shows him a photo of her grandfather who also has the very same tattoo. She takes him off to the graveyard where her grandfather is buried and the maze symbol is engraved on his gravestone. Then, she tells Duke to notice the same symbol on all the gravestones. Later we are shown that, unbeknown to Duke, there is a tattoo on Julia's shoulder that comes and goes. (Spiral)

Duke has a blackboard set up on his boat. Taped to it are photos of the Colorado Kid crime scene, Max Hansen and the other dead man's tattoo, plus Nathan's tattoo drawing. Three names are chalked on the board, Colorado Kid, Max Hansen and Audrey Parker. He adds Julia Carr's name. (Spiral)

Tattooed people
Phil Reiser, the lobster poacher-died after rapidly ageing through dealings with Beatrice Mitchell's alter-ego, Helena
Max Hansen
Julia Carr's grandfather
Julia Carr-though not on the forearm, hers appeared fleetingly on her left shoulder
The Glendower men
Nathan Wuornos—he got it himself, to have dibs on killing Duke
Jordan McKee
Dwight Hendrickson—a large one, across his back
Vince Teagues—Original leader of the Guard (although his has a birthmark of the same symbol, not the tattoo)
Sonia Weston
Guardsman
Nurse
Mitchell
Tall Guardsman
Reggie
All members of The Guard 

At the end of season 1 Max Hansen hints that he is a member of a group of Haven people with an agenda. In Over My Head the Teagues brothers tell Nathan about the Guard, who are the people who have the tattoo. The Guard looks after Troubled people and bring them to Haven. Vince and Dave recommend that Nathan speak to Jordan McKee if he wants a way to get to know the Guard.

Duke's search for protection
Vanessa Stanley's prediction of Duke's death unsettles him from his usual well-being and complaisance. He worries about being killed by the tattooed man to such an extent that when confronted with Jackie Clark, whose Trouble involves people seeing her as their worst fear, Duke sees a tattooed man and panics. (Fear & Loathing.) His search for a solution is given a boost when Audrey #2 makes Duke a proposal.

The Locameyer file
In Love Machine, when Audrey #2 needed Duke Crocker's help to go to Kick'Em Jenny Neck, she offered Duke an FBI file in exchange for him taking her there. The file regarded an old case concerning one Owen Locameyer. It contained two items: an interview between two FBI agents and Locameyer, and a map marked with the maze symbol that many Haven residents have as a tattoo on their forearms. Evi Ryan stole the file from Audrey #2's car and later gave it to Duke after making a copy for herself.

The interview deals with an atrocity committed by Locameyer in which he stated, "I was only trying to help. I'm not a bad person, I swear. It was the only way to stop them." This seems to be an indirect reference to an incident that happened during the previous outbreak of The Troubles. It is unclear whether Locameyer himself was Troubled or he was dealing with a situation caused by The Troubles. The map that came with the file led to a location outside Haven where something was buried, though the map didn't indicate what it was.

Duke's interest in the file regards the knowledge that a tattooed man would kill him. Following the map he reached the location, but Evi had beaten him to it and was already looking for what was there. She didn't understand the significance of the map, believing that it would lead to some treasure, but Duke had a different understanding. A brief discussion between them follows:

Evi: An FBI interrogation of a killer being hunted by a scary tattoo man and [bearing] this special secret of his.

Duke: The secret is how this guy stopped the tattoo people before they got to him... It's a secret I would like in on... I'm hoping that whatever I find buried here will give me the answers about how I stay alive. (Sparks and Recreation.)

The old floor board
Duke continues digging in the hole that Evi started and finds a flat wooden box which contains an old piece of floor boarding. On one side are the following words:

"town of Haven
Rasmussen House"

The significance of "Rasmussen House" is lost on Duke and Evi, so they each ask one of the Teagues brothers, who Duke describes as the "encyclopedias of Haven". They discover that what is now a wine shop called the "Foggy Grog" was years ago the Rasmussen House. In the basement of the building they find a patch in the flooring which matches the floor board that the map led them to. Duke rips up the patch and inserts the original board and a groove in the board forms part of an arrow that points towards a basement wall.(Sparks and Recreation)

The Crocker box
Duke breaks a hole in the wall to find a hessian bag that contains a small box, which, when examined, proves to be empty, only bearing the words "Omnia vincit amor" ("love conquers all") on the inside of the lid. When seen under the black light of an electric bug zapper, the name "Crocker" appears on the box's top, though Duke does not notice. (Sparks and Recreation.) Disappointed with his newfound box, he takes it to Beverley Keegan to find out what she knows of it. She explains that the box is "late colonial" and thinks that it is the work of Regis Glendower or someone from his shop. (Roots)

In episode Business as Usual the box is broken in a scuffle between Duke and Dwight and a key spills out from a joint. Duke calls Dave Teagues about the box. Dave tells him that it was originally designed as a set—a smaller box (the one Duke has) and a larger one. Duke surmises that the key opens the other box. This leads Duke and Dwight to search for the box. Duke thinks the box was probably hidden on Simon Crocker's old boat, which after investigation turns out to be Duke's boat, the Cape Rouge. After an intense search of the Cape Rouge they find a barrel which contains the larger box.

The second Crocker box
Duke and Audrey examine the box later. Inside the box are a number of weapons, knuckle duster, derringer, star knives, other weapons, papers and a ledger which deals with the Crocker family including names and dates that are hundreds of years old. Duke finds a note written by his father: "Duke—If you are reading this then I haven't survived. You are my son. My heir. It's up to you to finish my work./You must kill her." On the following pages of the ledger are two pictures of Audrey as Lucy Ripley from 27 years ago and as Sarah from the 1950s with a young Dave Teagues. After learning that the contents of the box relate to the Crocker family's ability to kill an affliction by killing the current Troubled member of a family, Duke buries the box at his father's grave in "Sins of the Fathers".